Hanneli Mustaparta (born 13 October 1982 in Bærum, Norway) is a photographer, fashion blogger, stylist and former model. She is the creator of fashion blog Hanneli and is a Vogue contributor. She was discovered at the age of 17 by the fashion photographer Per Heimly in 1999.

Online career 
Some of Hanneli's projects have been a featured in Vogue's 2010 "Best Dressed Issue", styling for H&M's "Womenswear and Menswear Styling Session", an interview with Vogue Italias Editor-in-Chief Franca Sozzani, and a position as co-host with Vogues editor-at-large and America's Next Top Model judge André Leon Talley for the CBS webcast "Fashion’s Night Out". In early 2011, the international clothing brand Zara licensed and issued several ‘Hanneli Mustaparta’ self-portrait T-shirts in four variations. Zara's first edition of the T-shirts totaled 160,000 units, which were sold in Zara shops around the world.

See also
Glamourina
Elin Kling

References

External links

Official Website

1982 births
Living people
Norwegian bloggers
Norwegian women bloggers
Norwegian female models
Photographers from Oslo
Fashion stylists
Norwegian women photographers
Models from Oslo